This is a  list of active duty United States senior enlisted leaders and advisors serving in the uniformed services of the United States. This list is intended to cover senior enlisted leaders and advisors attached to only three-star and four-star positions, with selected two-star and civilian positions included as well.

Background

A senior enlisted advisor (SEA) in the United States Armed Forces is the most senior enlisted service member in a unit and acts as an advisor to the commanding officer, representing all enlisted service members in the unit. Formally, E-9 billets for the senior enlisted advisor are established at Service unit (e.g., battalion, wing, or higher), command, major command, force, or fleet levels to the SEAs/CSELs of DoD Agencies and the Senior Enlisted Advisor to the Chairman of the Joint Chiefs of Staff. SEAs are also known as Command Senior Enlisted Leaders (CSEL). Always a non-commissioned officer, the SEA is the main link between the commanding officer and the enlisted service members under his or her charge, communicating the CO's wishes to the enlisted ranks of their given unit. For effective command and control of troops as well as liaising with external and atypical authorities (especially in international coalitions), a unit's commander, deputy commander, chief of staff and senior enlisted leader must work in concert.

Above the regular senior enlisted leaders and advisors are the service senior enlisted advisors who represent the service branches of the United States Armed Forces and advise the chief of their service branch on enlisted matters, namely:
 The Senior Enlisted Advisor to the Chairman (SEAC)
 The Sergeant Major of the Army (SMA)
 The Sergeant Major of the Marine Corps (SMMC)
 The Master Chief Petty Officer of the Navy (MCPON)
 The Chief Master Sergeant of the Air Force (CMSAF)
 The Chief Master Sergeant of the Space Force (CMSSF)
 The Master Chief Petty Officer of the Coast Guard (MCPOCG)
 The Senior Enlisted Advisor to the Chief of the National Guard Bureau (SEA)

List of senior enlisted positions

Department of Defense

Office of the Secretary of Defense

Joint Chiefs of Staff

Unified Combatant Commands

Other joint positions

Department of the Army

United States Army

Department of the Navy

United States Marine Corps

United States Navy

Department of the Air Force

United States Air Force

United States Space Force

Department of Homeland Security

United States Coast Guard

List of pending appointments

See also

 Sergeant major (United States)
 Master chief petty officer
 Chief master sergeant
 Senior Enlisted Advisor to the Chairman
 Sergeant Major of the Army
 Sergeant Major of the Marine Corps
 Master Chief Petty Officer of the Navy
 Chief Master Sergeant of the Air Force
 Chief Master Sergeant of the Space Force
 Senior Enlisted Advisor to the Chief of the National Guard Bureau
 List of active duty United States four-star officers
 List of active duty United States three-star officers
 List of active duty United States Army major generals
 List of active duty United States Marine Corps major generals
 List of active duty United States rear admirals
 List of active duty United States Air Force major generals
 List of active duty United States Space Force general officers
 List of current United States National Guard major generals

References

Notes

Lists of American military personnel
United States military-related lists